José Fernández Santini (born February 14, 1939) is a former Peruvian football defender, who played for the Peru national football team between 1959 and 1973, gaining 37 caps and scoring 2 goals. He was part of the Peru squad for the 1970 World Cup.

At club level, Fernández played for Universitario and Defensor Lima.

External links
 
 

1939 births
Living people
Peruvian footballers
Association football defenders
Peru international footballers
1970 FIFA World Cup players
Club Universitario de Deportes footballers
Peruvian football managers
Sporting Cristal managers
FBC Melgar managers